The Ferrier rearrangement is an organic reaction that involves a nucleophilic substitution reaction combined with an allylic shift in a glycal (a 2,3-unsaturated glycoside). It was discovered by the carbohydrate chemist Robert J. Ferrier.

Mechanism 
In the first step, a delocalized allyloxocarbenium ion (2) is formed, typically with the aid of a Lewis acid like indium(III) chloride or boron trifluoride. This ion reacts in situ with an alcohol, yielding a mixture of the α (3) and β (4) anomers of the 2-glycoside, with the double bond shifted to position 3,4.

Examples

Modifications

Forming of C-glycosides 
By replacing the alcohol with a silane, C-glycosides can be formed. With triethylsilane (R'=H), the reaction yields a 2,3-unsaturated deoxy sugar.

Nitrogen analogue 
An analogous reaction with nitrogen as the heteroatom was described in 1984 for the synthesis of the antibiotic substance streptazolin.

References 

Carbohydrate chemistry
Rearrangement reactions
Name reactions